Sir Donald Horne Macfarlane (July 1830 – 2 June 1904) was a Scottish merchant who entered politics and became a Member of Parliament (MP), firstly as a Home Rule League MP in Ireland and then as Liberal and Crofters Party MP in Scotland.

Macfarlane was born in Scotland, the youngest son of Allan Macfarlane, J.P., of Caithness and his wife Margaret Horne. He became an East Indies merchant as a tea trader and indigo plantation owner. While in India he was a passionate amateur photographer. He experimented freely and produced semi-abstract images.

At the 1880 general election Macfarlane was elected as a Home Rule Member of Parliament for Carlow County. The Carlow constituency lost one of its two seats under the Redistribution of Seats Act 1885, and at the 1885 general election Macfarlane stood instead for the Crofters Party in Argyllshire. He won the seat, but lost it in 1886. He was re-elected (by a narrow margin) at the 1892 general elections as a Liberal/Crofters candidate, holding it until a further defeat in 1895. He was knighted in the 1894 New Year Honours.  
 
Macfarlane married Mary Isabella Bagshawe in 1857 in India; she was the daughter of Henry Bagshawe. She predeceased him in 1887. They had one son, George Macfarlane. The following year he married Fanny Worswick Robson (1842–1943).

References

External links 
 

1830 births
1904 deaths
Members of the Parliament of the United Kingdom for Scottish constituencies
Members of the Parliament of the United Kingdom for County Carlow constituencies (1801–1922)
Home Rule League MPs
Scottish Liberal Party MPs
UK MPs 1880–1885
UK MPs 1885–1886
UK MPs 1892–1895
Members of London County Council
Progressive Party (London) politicians
Crofters Party MPs